ColosseoEAS is an international company based in Bratislava, Slovakia that specializes in LED design, multimedia and statistics solutions for sport venues. The integrated system approach, introduced in 2010, allows stadium and arena owners to input all data from any source into one platform. Moreover, the solution automates tasks, reduces redundant operations and distributes native information to a variety of devices like LED screens, IPTVs, advertising fasciae, mobile applications and even wearable devices. Founded in 2005 by four  Bratislava entrepreneurs, Colosseo in 2007 entered an exciting field that combines the latest LED lighting technologies with sports, advertising and stadium entertainment. Additionally, Colosseo is the only company in the world to have implemented five, real-time biometric facial recognition systems to enhance stadium security; first at O. Nepela Arena in Bratislava and the other in Spis Arena (Slovakia), TAURON Arena Krakow (Poland), Petrovsky stadium (Russia) and Yubileyny Sports Palace (Russia)

History

The company landed its first big contract when it agreed with the operational organizations of the Ice Hockey Championship IIHF to install the arena system including audio, scoreboard and security for the 2011 IIHF World Championship in the Ondrej Nepela Arena in Bratislava, and the Steel Aréna in Košice Slovakia. In 2012 Colosseo was chosen to supply the game presentation arena system for the Shayba Arena in Sochi, Russia for the 2014 Winter Olympics.  Colosseo EAS installed the only 360 degree LED score "cube" in the US when it installed the scoreboard in San Francisco's Cow Palace in 2012 after the Arena was rebuilt to accommodate the ECHL's San Francisco Bulls. Other installations include Nevskaya volna Swimming Stadium in St. Petersburg Russia, completed in 2011; the Albert Schultz Eishalle in Vienna, finished in 2011; the Lille OSC Football stadium where Colosseo's Belgian partner HTV installed a miniPerimeter system for advertising in 2011.

Technology
With the advancement of the new technologies, FPGA and processing electronics, SMD production mechanisms -Surface-mount technology and mass production of the LED diodes, it has become financially feasible to produce screens based on LED modules placed on Printed circuit boards.

Old LED technologies had a very high maintenance cost. The pixels and LED modules had to be repaired frequently and therefore there was at least one person dedicated for maintenance and repair of the screens. Today's technology is much more reliable and does not suffer from such problems. Moreover, the performance parameters have significantly improved.

Products
Colosseo offers three basic products for outdoor stadiums and indoor arenas: Game Presentation, Sports and Statistics and Security.
The company also supplies Content Management Systems (CMS) and digital signage solutions for airports.

Game presentation
Game Presentation displays typically use red, blue, and green light-emitting diodes LEDs, which combine to form one pixel of a video image.  These displays vary in size and resolution according to the stadium where they are installed. Some include 360 degree presentation as the Colosseo Cube does at San Francisco's Cow Palace.  These displays are typically installed in stadiums, arenas, and video advertising displays in European football stadiums. Game presentation includes advertising Ribbon Boards, Entertainment Lighting Systems, Audio Management, Scoreboards, Video and Multimedia Management.

Sports and statistics
Sports and Statistics break down into three categories:
 Player Statistics - live, game statistics from the multimedia system recording players
 Video Referee - multiple 50 fps cameras provide multiple angles with excellent image sharpness to allow referees to make the correct decisions
 Time Keeping - Time keeping and scoring management on a touch control screen with support for more than 18 different sports.

Security
Turnstiles and ticket sales are integrated into the security and monitoring systems that are coupled with real-time biometry and instant face recognition. Colosseo EAS has the only two successful installations of real time biometry and instant face recognition in the world, one at the Ondrej Nepela Arena in Bratislava and the other in Spiš Aréna in Spišská Nová Ves Slovakia.

Airport information
Colosseo CMS ensures control of screens showing centrally distributed video content. Individual screens are operated by control units connected to a central server. The system centrally manages the screens, detects their condition and the content being displayed.

Major installations

Capital One Arena - Washington DC, United States, (2014): Installed Single Media Platform that controls all video and multimedia inputs from different sources and outputs them to any screen in the arena.

Shayba Arena - Sochi, Russia, (2014): Installed for the 2014 Winter Olympic Games, the installation includes a center-hung scoreboard and video referee system.

Constant Vanden Stock Stadium - Anderlecht, Brussels, Belgium (2013): Home of RSC Anderlecht installed perimeter advertising strips around the pitch in compliance with UEFA regulations for the 2013-2014 Champion's League and controllers for the stadium's three scoreboards.

Allianz Park - London, England (2013): Installed for the 2013 Aviva Premiership, for the Saracens F.C.; the installation includes one of the most advanced giant mobile scoreboard in professional rugby. The 2013 Saracens F.C., playing the Aviva Premiership, make their home here.

Cow Palace - San Francisco, California, United States (2012) : Installed for the 2012 ECHL Hockey League season of the San Francisco Bulls; it is one of the most advanced scoreboards to grace a minor-league hockey arena. The 2012 San Francisco Bulls, playing the ECHL make their home here.

Ondrej Nepela Arena - Bratislava, Slovakia (2011): Installed for the 2011 IIHF World Championships; the arena is also home to the ice hockey club Slovan Bratislava currently competing in the new KHL hockey league.

Ice Palace Saint Petersburg - St. Petersburg, Russia, (2011): Darepro Video Cube and a new LED video ring installed in 2011. SKA Saint Petersburg hockey club makes it home in this arena. The team is a participant in the KHL hockey league.

See also
Aquatic timing system
Scoreboard

References

Billboards
Companies based in Bratislava
Companies established in 2006
Slovak brands
2006 establishments in Slovakia